Septic may refer to:

 Septic shock, a medical condition
 Septic tank or septic system, a component of a small scale sewage disposal system
 Septic equation, a polynomial of degree seven
 Slang term for "American" in the Cockney dialect

See also
 Sepsis
 Aseptic
 Antiseptic